The Coalition of the Radical Left – Progressive Alliance, best known by the syllabic abbreviation SYRIZA (a pun on the Greek adverb , meaning "from the roots" or "radically"), is a left-wing political party in Greece. It was founded in 2004 as a political coalition of left-wing and radical left parties, and registered as a political party in 2012. 

A left-wing populist, democratic socialist, progressive and social democratic party, Syriza holds a pro-Europeanist stance. Syriza also advocates for alter-globalisation, LGBT rights, and secularism. Syriza is the second largest party in the Hellenic Parliament. Party chairman Alexis Tsipras served as Prime Minister of Greece from 26 January 2015 to 20 August 2015 and from 21 September 2015 to 8 July 2019. It is a member of the Party of the European Left.

History

Formation 
Although Syriza was launched in 2004, before that year's legislative election, the roots of the process that led to its formation can be traced back to the Space for Dialogue for the Unity and Common Action of the Left (Greek: Χώρος Διαλόγου για την Ενότητα και Κοινή Δράση της Αριστεράς, Chóros Dialógou gia tin Enótita kai Koiní Drási tis Aristerás) in 2001. It was made up of various organizations of the Greek political left, that, despite different ideological and historical backgrounds, held common ground in several important issues that had arisen in Greece in the late 1990s, such as the Kosovo War, privatizations of state businesses, and social and civil rights.

The Space provided the ground from which participating parties could work together on issues such as their opposition to the neoliberal reform of the pension and social security systems, and the new anti-terrorism legislation, a review of the role of the European Union and a redetermination of Greece's position in it, and the preparation of the Greek participation at the 27th G8 summit in 2001. Even though it was not a political organization, but rather an effort to bring together the parties and organizations that attended, the Space gave birth to some electoral alliances for the 2002 Greek local elections, the most successful being the one led by Manolis Glezos for the super-prefecture of Athens-Piraeus. As part of the larger European Social Forum, the Space also provided the ground from which several of the member parties and organizations launched the Greek Social Forum.

2004 legislative election 

The defining moment for the birth of Syriza came in the 2004 legislative election. Most of the participants of the Space sought to develop a common platform that could potentially lead to an electoral alliance. This led to the eventual formation of the Coalition of the Radical Left in January 2004.

The parties that had formed the Coalition of the Radical Left in January 2004 were the Coalition of Left, of Movements and Ecology (Synaspismos or SYN), the Renewing Communist Ecological Left (AKOA), the Internationalist Workers Left (DEA), the Movement for the United in Action Left (KEDA), which was a splinter group of the Communist Party of Greece (KKE), Active Citizens, which was a political organisation associated with Manolis Glezos, and other independent left-wing groups or activists Although the Communist Organisation of Greece (KOE) had participated in the Space, it decided not to take part in the Coalition of the Radical Left.

In the legislative election, the coalition gathered 241,539 votes (3.3% of the total) and elected six members to parliament. All six were members of Synaspismos, the largest of the coalition parties, which led to a lot of tension within the coalition.

Crisis and revitalization 

After the 2004 legislative election, the smaller parties accused Synaspismos of not honoring an agreement to have one of its members of parliament resign so that Yannis Banias of the AKOA could take his seat. Tension built up and resulted in the split of the Internationalist Workers Left and the formation of Kokkino (Red), both of which remained within the coalition. The frame of the crisis within SYRIZA was the reluctance of Synaspismos to adopt and maintain the political agreement for a clear denial of centre-left politics.

Three months after the 2004 legislative election, Synaspismos chose to run independently from the rest of the coalition for the 2004 European Parliament election in Greece and some of the smaller parties of the coalition supported the feminist Women for Another Europe (Greek: Γυναίκες για μια Άλλη Ευρώπη, Gynaíkes gia mia Álli Evrópi) list.

The crisis ended in December 2004 with the 4th convention of Synaspismos, when a large majority within the party voted for the continuation of the coalition. This change of attitude was further intensified with the election of Alekos Alavanos, a staunch supporter of the coalition, as president of Synaspismos, after its former leader, Nikos Konstantopoulos, stepped down.

The coalition was further strengthened by the organization in May 2006 of the 4th European Social Forum in Athens, and by a number of largely successful election campaigns, such as those in Athens and Piraeus, during the 2006 Greek local elections. The coalition ticket in the municipality of Athens was headed by Alexis Tsipras, proposed by Alavanos who declared Synaspismos' "opening to the new generation".

2007 legislative election 

Opinion polls had indicated that Syriza was expected to make significant gains in the election, with predictions ranging from 4% to 5% of the electorate. On 16 September, it gained 5.0% of the vote in the 2007 legislative election.

Prior to the election, the participating parties had agreed on a common declaration by 22 June. The signed Declaration of the Coalition of the Radical Left outlined the common platform on which it would compete in the following election and outlined the basis for the political alliance. The coalition of 2007 has also expanded from its original composition in 2004. On 20 June 2007, the KOE announced its participation into the coalition. On 21 August, the environmentalist Ecological Intervention (Greek: Οικολογική Παρέμβαση, Oikologikí Parémvasi) also joined, and the Democratic Social Movement (DIKKI) also announced its participation in the coalition on 22 August 2007.

On 2 September, the Areios Pagos refused to include the title of DIKKI in the Syriza electoral alliance, saying that the internal procedures followed by DIKKI were flawed. This was criticized by Syriza and DIKKI as inappropriate interference by the courts in party political activity.

2007–2011 elections and developments 

On 27 November 2007, Alavanos announced that, for private reasons, he would not be seeking to renew his presidency of Synaspismos. The 5th party congress of Synaspismos elected Alexis Tsipras, a municipal councillor for the municipality of Athens, as party president on 10 February 2008. Alavanos retained the parliamentary leadership of Syriza, as Tsipras was not at that time a member of parliament. Tsipras achieved considerable popularity with the Greek electorate, which led to a surge in support for Syriza in opinion polls, up to 18 percent of the vote at its peak.

At the end of June 2008, Start – Socialist Internationalist Organisation (Greek: Ξεκίνημα – Σοσιαλιστική Διεθνιστική Οργάνωση, Xekínima – Sosialistiké Diethnistikí Orgánosi) announced that it would join the coalition.

During the run-up to the 2009 European Parliament election in Greece, Syriza, amid turbulent internal developments, saw its poll share decrease to 4.7%, with the result that only one Syriza candidate (Nikos Hountis) was elected to the European Parliament. This caused renewed internal strife, leading to the resignation of former Synaspismos president Alekos Alavanos from his seat in the Greek parliament, a resignation that was withdrawn a few days later.

In the 2009 Greek legislative election held on 4 October, Syriza won 4.6% of the vote (slightly below its 2007 showing), returning thirteen MPs to the Hellenic Parliament. The incoming MPs included Tsipras, who took over as Syriza's parliamentary leader.

In June 2010, Ananeotiki (Reformist Wing) of radical social democrats in Synapsismós split away from the party, at the same time leaving Syriza. This reduced Syriza's parliamentary group to nine MPs. The four MPs who left formed a new party, the Democratic Left (DIMAR).

2012 general elections 

In a move of voters away from the parties which participated in the coalition government under the premiership of Lucas Papademos in November 2011, Syriza gained popular support in the opinion polls, as did the KKE and DIMAR. Opinion polls in the run-up to the May 2012 election showed Syriza with 10–12% support. The minor Unitary Movement (a PASOK splinter group) also joined the coalition in March 2012.

In the first legislative election held on 6 May, the party polled over 16% and quadrupled its number of seats, becoming the second largest party in parliament, behind New Democracy (ND). After the election, Tsipras was invited by the President of Greece to try to form a government but failed, as he could not muster the necessary number of parliamentarians. Subsequently, Tsipras rejected a proposal by the president to join a coalition government with the centre-right and centre-left parties.

For the second legislative election held on 17 June, Syriza re-registered as a single party (adding the United Social Front moniker) as its previous coalition status would have disqualified it from receiving the 50 "bonus" seats given to the largest polling party under the Greek electoral system. Although Syriza increased its share of the vote to just under 27%, ND polled 29.8% and claimed the bonus. With 71 seats, Syriza became the main opposition party to a coalition government composed of ND, PASOK, and DIMAR. Tsipras subsequently formed a Shadow Cabinet in July 2012.

Unitary party 
In July 2013, a Syriza congress was held to discuss the organisation of the party. Important outcomes included a decision in principle to dissolve the participating parties in Syriza in favour of a unitary party.  However, implementation was deferred for three months to allow time for four of the parties which were reluctant to dissolve to consider their positions.  Tsipras was confirmed as chairman with 74% of the vote. Delegates supporting the Left Platform (Greek: Αριστερή Πλάτφορμα, Aristerí Plátforma) led by Panayiotis Lafazanis, which wanted to leave the door open to quitting the euro, secured 30% (60) of the seats on Syriza's central committee. A modest success was also claimed by the Communist Platform (Greek section of the International Marxist Tendency), who managed to get two members elected to the party's central committee.

2014 elections 

Local elections and elections to the European Parliament were held in May 2014. In the 2014 European Parliament election in Greece on 25 May, Syriza reached first place with 26.5% of vote, ahead of ND at 22.7%. The position in the local elections was less clear-cut, due to the number of non-party local tickets and independents contending for office.  Syriza's main success was the election of Rena Dourou to the Attica Regional governorship with 50.8% of the second-round vote over the incumbent Yiannis Sgouros. Its biggest disappointment was the failure of Gabriel Sakellaridis to win the Athens Mayoralty election, being beaten in the second ballot by Giorgos Kaminis with 51.4% to his 48.6%.

Thessaloniki Programme 

On 13 September 2014, Syriza unveiled the Thessaloniki Programme, a set of policy proposals containing its central demands for economic and political restructuring.

January 2015 election 

The Hellenic Parliament failed to elect a new President of State by 29 December 2014, and was dissolved. A snap legislative election was scheduled for 25 January 2015. Syriza had a lead in opinion polls, but its anti-austerity position worried investors and eurozone supporters. The party's chief economic advisor, John Milios, downplayed fears that Greece under a Syriza government would exit the eurozone while shadow development minister George Stathakis disclosed the party's intention to crack down on Greek oligarchs if it wins the election.  In the election, Syriza defeated the incumbent ND and became the largest party in the Hellenic Parliament, receiving 36.3% of the vote and 149 out of 300 seats.

Tsipras was congratulated by French president François Hollande who stressed Greco-French friendship, as well as by leftist leaders all over Europe, including Pablo Iglesias Turrión of Spain's Podemos and Katja Kipping of Germany's Die Linke. German government official Hans-Peter Friedrich said: "The Greeks have the right to vote for whom they want. We have the right to no longer finance Greek debt." The Financial Times and Radio Free Europe reported on Syriza's ties with Russia and extensive correspondence with the Russian political scientist Aleksandr Dugin. Early in the SYRIZA-led government of Greece, the Russian President Vladimir Putin and Tsipras concluded a face-to-face meeting by announcing an agreement on boosting investment ties between the two nations. Tsipras also said that Greece would seek to mend ties between Russia and European Union through European institutions. Tsipras also said that Greece was not in favor of Western sanctions imposed on Russia, adding that it risked the start of another Cold War.

Government formation 

On 26 January 2015, Tsipras and Independent Greeks (ANEL) leader Panos Kammenos agreed to form a coalition government of Syriza and ANEL, with Tsipras becoming Prime Minister of Greece and Greek-Australian economist Yanis Varoufakis appointed Minister of Finance and Panos Kammenos appointed Minister of Defence. In July 2015, Yanis Varoufakis was replaced by Euclid Tsakalotos as Minister of Finance.

Party split and September 2015 election 

Following the acceptance of the third memorandum with the institutions on Greece's debt by Tsipras and the Syriza government, 25 Syriza MPs who rejected the terms of the bailout, including the party's Left Platform and the Internationalist Workers Left faction, split to form a new party Popular Unity (Greek: Λαϊκή Ενότητα, Laïkí Enótita, LE). They were led by Panagiotis Lafazanis. Many other activists left Syriza at this time. International supporters of Syriza were divided, as some of its erstwhile backers felt that the party betrayed its voters and those abroad who had seen a radical promise in the party. Author and communist activist Helena Sheehan wrote that "Syriza was a horizon of hope. Now it is a vortex of despair."

Having lost his majority in parliament, Tsipras resigned as Prime Minister on 20 August 2015, and called for fresh elections on September 20. Although polls suggested a close contest between Syriza and ND, Syriza led ND by 7%, winning 145 seats; LE polled below the 3% threshold and had no parliamentary representation. Tsipras renewed Syriza's previous coalition agreement with ANEL, giving the new government 155 seats out of 300 in parliament.

2019 elections 

On 26 May, following losses in the 2019 European Parliament election and the concurrent local elections, Tsipras announced a snap election. During the legislative election in September, the party was defeated by ND. Following the result, Syriza moved into opposition.

Cabinet members 

Members of the former Cabinet were sworn in on 23 September 2015:
 Alexis Tsipras – Prime Minister
 Giannis Dragasakis – Deputy Prime Minister
 Euclid Tsakalotos – Finance
 Giorgos Stathakis – Economy, Development and Tourism
 Georgios Katrougalos – Labour and Social Affairs
 Nikos Toskas – Citizens' Protection
 Ioannis Mouzalas – Immigration Policy
 Panos Skourletis – Environment and Energy
 Nikos Kotzias – Foreign Affairs
 Panagiotis Kouroumblis – Interior
 Nikos Paraskevopoulos – Justice, Transparency and Human Rights
 Aristides Baltas – Culture and Sports
 Nikos Filis – Education, Research and Religious Affairs
 Andreas Xanthos – Health and Welfare
 Christos Spirtzis – Infrastructure, Transport and Networks
 Thodoris Dritsas – Maritime Affairs and Island Policy
 Vangelis Apostolou – Rural Development and Food
 Alekos Flambouraris – Coordinating Government Operations
 Nikos Pappas – State
 Olga Gerovassili – Government Spokesperson

The Ministry of Defense was filled by a non-Syriza nominee, Panos Kammenos of the Independent Greeks (ANEL).

Ideology 
The main constituent element of the original coalition was Synaspismos, a democratic socialist party, but Syriza was founded with a goal of uniting left-wing and radical left groups and had included a broad array of groups and independent activists as well as ideologies, from social democrats and democratic socialists to Marxist–Leninists and Trotskyists. Additionally, despite its secular ideology, many members are Christians who are anti-clerical and opposed to the privileges of the state-sponsored Church of Greece. From 2013, the coalition became a unitary party, although it retained its name with the addition of United Social Front.

Syriza had been characterized as an anti-establishment party, whose success had sent "shock-waves across the EU". Although it has abandoned its old identity, that of a hard-left protest voice, becoming more left-wing populist in character, and stating that it would not abandon the eurozone, its chairman Alexis Tsipras has declared that the "euro is not my fetish". The Vice President of the European Parliament and Syriza MEP Dimitrios Papadimoulis stated that Greece should "be a respectable member of the European Union and the euro zone", and that "there is absolutely no case for a Grexit". Tsipras clarified that Syriza "does not support any sort of Euroscepticism", though the party was seen by some observers as a soft Eurosceptic force for advocating another Europe free of austerity and neoliberalism. Since governing, the party took a more pro-Europeanist stance, saying that its regulatory reforms, while remaining in the Eurozone, enabled the government, in the words of Filippa Chatzistavrou, "to better address negative externalities and spillovers between Greece and other EU Member States." By 2019, Syriza had become a mainstream centre-left party, taking advantage of the traditional centre-left PASOK's collapse. Tsipras stated that his goal was to build a broad progressive front without abandoning the party's core ideology and left-wing coalition.

During the party's time in government, SYRIZA has practised a soft neoliberal policy of austerity, despite its vocal anti-neoliberalism, which contradicted its pre-electoral pledges, ideological outlook, political practice, and its own history, being stuck in populist rhetoric and what are termed "symbolic politics", unable to preserve its radicalism. Observers' analysis has revealed similarities with the previous PASOK governments, in particular the party's outlook from 1974 to 1981.

Group of 53 
The Group of 53, also known as 53+, are a faction within Syriza. The group was founded in mid-2014 and stands ideologically between the Left Platform and Tsipras's core backers. Both Euclid Tsakalotos and Gabriel Sakellaridis are members of the group. Another member of the group was Tassos Koronakis, the former secretary of the Syriza Central Committee who resigned following the announcement of the snap elections in September 2015.

Left Platform 

The Left Platform were a faction within Syriza, positioned ideologically on the far-left of the party. In August 2015, 25 Left Platform MPs within Syriza left the party and formed Popular Unity to contest the snap elections. The grouping was led by former energy minister Panagiotis Lafazanis.

Former constituent parties 

Syriza as a unitary party was formed through the merger of the following parties (in English alphabetical order):

The party also includes a number of independent leftist activists.

After the creation of the unitary party in 2013 some of the constituent members decided to dissolve, such as Synaspismos,  Renewing Communist Ecological Left, Ecosocialists of Greece and Unitary Movement.

After the third Memorandum of Understanding with the European Stability Mechanism was accepted in 2015, organizations like Internationalist Workers' Left, Active Citizens, New Fighter, Democratic Social Movement, Anticapitalist Political Group and the Communist Tendency (Greek section of IMT) joined the Left Platform to create Popular Unity.

The Communist Organization of Greece also left Syriza at that time.

Criticism
The party has been criticized for the way it approaches far-left terrorism in Greece. 

Thodoris Dritsas, a member of SYRIZA and ex-minister, drew criticism when he declared that "no one has been terrorized, I believe, by the action of these terrorist organizations. No one has been terrorized by the 17 November Group. On the contrary, the Greek people have been terrified by too many other policies". SYRIZA and Dritsas retracted that statement later on. On the issue of SYRIZA's stance towards the terrorist organization 17N, the party has also been criticised as people who are or were affiliated with the party have testified as defense witnesses during the organization's trial. In 2021, the party drew criticism again as fifteen of its members published a declaration supporting 17N's leading member Dimitris Koufontinas, after he went on a hunger strike as a result of his demanding to be moved to another prison facility.

SYRIZA's Triantafyllos Mitafidis was also criticized after he declared "enough with the obsession with legality. I cannot accept the opinion that we respect the decisions of the Greek Council of State".

Election results

Hellenic Parliament 

A 2004 results are compared to the Synaspismos totals in the 2000 election.
B January 2015 results are compared to the combined totals for Syriza and OP totals in the June 2012 election.

European Parliament 

A 2009 results are compared to the Synaspismos totals in the 2004 election.

Representatives 
As of the 2019 European Parliament election in Greece, SYRIZA holds six seats in the European Parliament. These seats are held by:
 Dimitris Papadimoulis
 Elena Kountoura
 Kostas Arvanitis
 Stelios Kouloglou
 Petros S. Kokkalis
 Alexis Georgoulis

Party leaders

Symbols
From its founding in 2004 till September 2020, Syriza was represented by three colored flags, each representing the three main pillars of its political positions, Red (Socialism), Green (Ecology) and Purple (Feminism). After the restructuring of the party in 2020, along with the logo change, the symbol was also changed to a star, made out of the Greek letters Σ and Υ.

Logos

See also 
 Syriza Youth

References

Bibliography

Further reading 
 Ovenden, Kevin (2015). Syriza: Inside the Labyrinth. Pluto Press.
 Sheehan, Helena (2017). The Syriza Wave. Monthly Review Press.
 Varoufakis, Yanis (2017). Adults in the Room. Vintage.

External links 

 
 Only Syriza Can Save Greece. James K. Galbraith and Yanis Varoufakis. The New York Times, 23 June 2013.
 Kitsikis/article Grèce. Le Synaspismos tiraillé entre social-démocratie et anarchisme, Grande Europe, no.16, janvier 2010, La Documentation Française. Read on Line
 Greece: Phase One. Jacobin. 22 January 2015.
 The pro-worker, pro-growth experiment in Greece is under threat. Senator Bernie Sanders for The Guardian. 17 February 2015.
 Indebted yes, but not Guilty by Slavoj Žižek, Potemkin Review, 22 February 2015.

 
2012 establishments in Greece
Centre-left parties in Europe
Democratic socialist parties in Europe
Left-wing politics in Greece
Left-wing populism
Left-wing parties in Europe
Multicultural parties in Greece
Parties represented in the European Parliament
Party of the European Left member parties
Political parties established in 2012
Pro-European political parties in Greece
Progressive parties
Secular parties in Greece
Social democratic parties in Greece
Socialist parties in Greece